Mrs. Lowe may refer to:

Mrs. Lowe, a character from the 1990 film Awakenings
Mrs. Lowe, a character from the 1973 film The Train Robbers
Mrs. Lowe, a character from the 1960 film Comanche Station
Mrs. Lowe, a character from the 2015  film Experimenter (film)
Mrs. Lowe, a character from the 1918 film The Eyes of Julia Deep

See also
Lowe (surname)